The A. Quinn Jones Museum and Cultural Center is a  museum in Gainesville, Florida. The museum preserves the legacy of Allen Quin Jones (1893–1994), a local educator who dedicated his life to educating African-Americans.

History

Private house
The house originally belonged to the family of A. Quinn Jones. Jones became the first principal of Lincoln High School (Gainesville, Florida) and held a long career there.

High school
Jones developed the house into the second fully accredited African-American high school in the state of Florida.

Museum
The house is now a museum honoring Jones. Known as the A. Quinn Jones Museum & Cultural Center, it features exhibits that detail the history of African Americans in Gainesville and Alachua County during the Civil Rights Movement.

The museum was temporarily closed to the public during the COVID-19 pandemic.

Designation as a historic place
The house was added to the National Register of Historic Places on January 27, 2010.

See also
National Register of Historic Places listings in Florida
List of museums in Florida

Further reading

References

Houses on the National Register of Historic Places in Florida
National Register of Historic Places in Gainesville, Florida
Buildings and structures in Gainesville, Florida
Houses in Alachua County, Florida
Museums in Alachua County, Florida
1925 establishments in Florida
Houses completed in 1925